Elaine Lister is a Scottish wheelchair curler.

Teams

References

External links 

Living people
Scottish female curlers
Scottish wheelchair curlers
Year of birth missing (living people)
Place of birth missing (living people)